Giovanni Giacomo Sclafenati  (Schiaffinati) (10 September 1451 – 9 December 1497) was an Italian cardinal of the Catholic Church. He was bishop of Parma in Italy.

He was made cardinal on 15 November 1483 by Pope Sixtus IV.

Cardinal Sclafenati died in Rome on 8 December 1497 at the age of 47, and was buried in S. Agostino.

Notes and references

Bibliography

External links
Salvador Miranda, The Cardinals of the Holy Roman Church, "SCHIAFFINATI, Giovanni Giacomo (1451-1497)"; retrieved: 2 November 2018.

1497 deaths
Burials at Sant'Agostino, Rome
15th-century Italian cardinals
Bishops of Parma
15th-century Italian Roman Catholic bishops
Year of birth unknown
1451 births